Events from the year 1552 in Sweden

Incumbents
 Monarch – Gustav I

Events

 22 August - The wedding between the King and Catherine Stenbock.

Births

Deaths

 14 April - Laurentius Andreae, Protestant reformer and scholar (born 1470)
 19 April - Olaus Petri,  writer, judge and major contributor to the Protestant Reformation (born 1493)
 Date unknown - Anna Karlsdotter, landowner (born unknown date)

References

 
Years of the 16th century in Sweden
Sweden